Degree may refer to:

As a unit of measurement 
 Degree (angle), a unit of angle measurement
 Degree of geographical latitude
 Degree of geographical longitude
 Degree symbol (°), a notation used in science, engineering, and mathematics 
 Degree (temperature), any of various units of temperature measurement
 Degree API, a measure of density in the petroleum industry
 Degree Baumé, a pair of density scales
 Degree Brix, a measure of sugar concentration
 Degree Gay-Lussac, a measure of the alcohol content of a liquid by volume, ranging from 0° to 100°
 Degree proof, or simply proof, the alcohol content of a liquid, ranging from 0° to 175° in the UK, and from 0° to 200° in the U.S.
 Degree of curvature, a unit of curvature measurement, used in civil engineering
 Degrees of freedom (mechanics), the number of displacements or rotations needed to define the position and orientation of a body
 Degrees of freedom (physics and chemistry), a concept describing dependence on a countable set of parameters
 Degree of frost, a unit of temperature measurement
 Degrees Lintner, a measure of enzymatic activity
 Degrees Lovibond, a measure of transparency
 Degree of unsaturation, in organic chemistry, also known as the index of hydrogen deficiency or rings plus double bonds
 dGH, degrees of general hardness of water
 Degree of carbonate hardness of water (degree KH)

In mathematics 

 Degree of a polynomial, the exponent of its term with the highest exponent
 Degree of a field extension
 Degree of an algebraic number field, its degree as a field extension of the rational numbers
 Degree of an algebraic variety
 Degree (graph theory), or valency, the number of edges incident to a vertex of a graph
 Degree of a continuous mapping, a generalization of winding number
 Degrees of freedom, the number of parameters of a system that may vary independently
 Degree of a character in representation theory
 Degree of unsolvability in recursion theory
 Degree of a central simple algebra
 Degree of a permutation group, the number of elements that are permuted
 Degree of a differential equation, the power of the highest derivative therein
 Degree of a th root

In education 

Academic degree, an academic rank, title or award
 Substantive degree ranks from lowest to highest
 Foundation degree
 Associate's degree
 Bachelor's degree
 Master's degree
 Doctorate
 Particular degrees (focus or method)
 Engineer's degree
 Specialist degree
 Lambeth degree
 External degree
 Microdegree
 Honorary degrees
 Ad eundem degree
 Honorary degree

Vocational degree, an award in vocational education

Other measures 

 Degree (music), identification of a note in a scale by its relation to the tonic
 Degree of inventiveness in inventions and patents
 Degree of separation in connectivity between groups (first degree is closest)
 Degree of relationship, in kinship between individuals (first degree is closest)
 Consanguinity, or level of kinship
 Comparison (grammar) - degrees of comparison include positive, comparative, and superlative (e.g. "good", "better", and "best", respectively)
 The severity of a crime, e.g., first degree murder (first degree is worst)
 The intensity of a burn (the higher the worse)
 A level of initiation, often used in fraternal organizations
 A ranking of black belt, in certain martial arts

People 

 Asha Jaquilla Degree (born 1990), an American child who went missing in 2000

Brands 

 Da Degrees, Canadian record label and hip hop collective
 Degree (deodorant), a brand of antiperspirant

Other uses 

 Degree (freemasonry)
 Degree of Knights Templar (Freemasonry), a special case of a degree in freemasonry